) is the 9th single by Nogizaka46. It was released on July 9, 2014. It debuted in number one on the weekly Oricon Singles Chart. It was the best-selling single in July. It has sold a total of 481,533 copies, as of August 25 (chart date). It reached number one on the Billboard Japan Hot 100. It was the 11th best-selling single of the year in Japan, with 526,564 copies.

Release 
This single was released in 4 versions. Type-A, Type-B, Type-C and a regular edition. Type-C includes the undergroup member's song. Rena Matsui who is an exchange member from SKE48 joined this single. The center position in the choreography for the title song is held by Nanase Nishino.

Track listing

Type-A

Type-B

Type-C

Regular Edition

Chart and certifications

Weekly charts

Year-end charts

Certifications

References

Further reading

External links
 Discography  on Nogizaka46 Official Website 
 
 Nogizaka46 Movie Digest on YouTube

2014 singles
2014 songs
Japanese-language songs
Nogizaka46 songs
Oricon Weekly number-one singles
Billboard Japan Hot 100 number-one singles
Songs with lyrics by Yasushi Akimoto